Hajjiabad-e Sofla (also Romanized as Ḩājjīābād-e Soflá; also known as Ḩājjīābād) is a village in Akhtarabad Rural District, in the Central District of Malard County, Tehran Province, Iran. At the 2006 census, its population was 208, in 49 families.

References 

Populated places in Malard County